Bernard Denis Julien (born  13 March 1950) is a Trinidad and Tobago cricketer who played as an allrounder. As a right handed batsman who bowled left arm pace and spin, Julien played in 24 Tests and 12 One Day Internationals for the West Indies. He was a noteworthy member of the Windies' 1975 World Cup winning squad. Julien also featured for Trinidad and Tobago and English side Kent in his cricketing career.

Domestic career
Born in 1950, Julien was raised in the Trinidadian village of Carenage. He went on to attend St. Mary's College in his teenage years. As an allrounder who played as a right handed batsman who bowled left arm pace and spin, Julien eventually made his first class debut, at the age of 18, for South Trinidad against North Trinidad in the Beaumont Cup. A year later he played his first game for Trinidad and Tobago at the senior level. During the 1969-70 season he became a regular for the side in regional domestic competitions. During 1970 Julien joined up with English county cricket club Kent. At Kent he at first played, for two seasons, with the club's second XI outfit. During 1972 he made his debut, earning Kent's 152nd cap, for the side's first XI.  Thereafter Julien was unfortunately hampered in terms of his appearances for the club, by a set of recurrent injuries and the occasional tour with the Windies. As a result he had only four full or mostly full seasons at Kent. In so doing he surpassed 400 first class runs and picked over 40 wickets during each of those said seasons with the club.

International career
During just his third test match Julien scored 121 from 127 delieveries, sharing a 150 run partnership with Garry Sobers, at Lord's in the Windies' 1973 tour of England. Julien was also a member of the Windies squad for the 1975 Cricket World Cup. He picked up 4 for 20 vs Sri Lanka and 4 for 27 against New Zealand in the tournament's semi final. During the final against Australia, Julien scored a vital 26 not out, as the Windies eventually won the cup. He later joined Australian Kerry Packer's World Series Cricket tournament in 1977. Julien's international career came to an end after he joined the rebel tours to South Africa in 1982–83 and 1983–84, defying the international sporting boycott of the apartheid state.

Personal life
When his playing days came to a close, Julien worked for Trinidad and Tobago's Ministry of Sports and embarked upon a coaching career. He was later diagnosed with throat cancer and eventually recovered from such.

References

External links

1950 births
Living people
Kent cricketers
Cricketers at the 1975 Cricket World Cup
Trinidad and Tobago cricketers
North Trinidad cricketers
West Indies One Day International cricketers
West Indies Test cricketers
World Series Cricket players
International Cavaliers cricketers